This is a list of the Australian moth species of the family Epermeniidae. It also acts as an index to the species articles and forms part of the full List of moths of Australia.

Epermeniinae
Agiton idioptila Turner, 1926
Epermenia commonella Gaedike, 1968
Epermenia exilis Meyrick, 1897
Epermenia tasmanica Gaedike, 1968
Epermenia trileucota Meyrick, 1921
Paraepermenia santaliella Gaedike, 1968

Ochromolopinae
Gnathifera acacivorella (Gaedike, 1968)
Gnathifera aphronesa (Meyrick, 1897)
Gnathifera australica (Gaedike, 1968)
Gnathifera bidentata (Gaedike, 1968)
Gnathifera bipunctata (Gaedike, 1968)
Gnathifera eurybias (Meyrick, 1897)
Gnathifera opsias (Meyrick, 1897)
Gnathifera paraphronesa (Gaedike, 1968)
Gnathifera paropsias (Gaedike, 1972)
Gnathifera pseudaphronesa (Gaedike, 1972)
Gnathifera queenslandi (Gaedike, 1968)
Gnathifera uptonella (Gaedike, 1968)
Ochromolopis cornutifera (Gaedike, 1968)

The following species belongs to the subfamily Ochromolopinae, but has not been assigned to a genus yet. Given here is the original name given to the species when it was first described:
Epermenia epispora Meyrick, 1897
Epermenia xeranta Meyrick, 1917

External links 
Epermeniidae at Australian Faunal Directory

Australia